are a type of wagashi, which is a general term for traditional Japanese sweets and candies. Namagashi may contain fruit jellies, other gelatines such as Kanten, or sweetened bean paste.  Namagashi is detailed, designed with using seasonal and natural motifs such as leaves and flowers to reflect the various objects of nature in Japan's four seasons. Namagashi are usually freshly made and are much more moist than other wagashi, like higashi. It generally contains 30% more water than other types. Like other wagashi, namagashi are made of natural ingredients; additives are rarely used. Namagashi is generally served with tea, and it's traditionally eaten on New Year's for good luck.

References

See also
 Higashi

Wagashi
Chadō